Events from the year 1685 in art.

Events
 (unknown)

Works

Paintings

 Richard Brakenburgh – Feast of St Nicholas
 Claudio Coello – St Dominic of Guzman (approximate date)
 Aert de Gelder – Esther and Mordecai
 Andrea Pozzo - Dome at Sant'Ignazio
 Simon Ushakov – The Last Supper

Sculpture
 Pierre Lepautre – Faune au chevreau

Births
 March 17 – Jean-Marc Nattier, French painter (died 1766)
 November 5 - Peter Angelis, French painter (died 1734)
 November 15 – Balthasar Denner, German portrait painter (died 1749)
 date unknown
 Charles Cressent, French furniture-maker, sculptor and fondeur-ciseleur of the régence style (died 1768)
 Pietro Paolo Cristofari, Italian artist responsible for a number of the mosaics in St. Peter's Basilica (died 1743)
 Bernardo Germán de Llórente, Spanish painter of the late-Baroque period (died 1757)
 Francesco Sleter, Italian painter active in England (died 1775)
 Jan van Gool, Dutch painter and writer (died 1763)
 probable
 William Kent, architect and designer (died 1748)
 Johann Georg Schmidt, Austrian Baroque painter (died 1748)

Deaths
 January – Herman Saftleven, Dutch painter (born 1609)
 March 25 – Nicolas Robert, French miniaturist and engraver (born 1614)
 May – Adriaen van Ostade, Dutch genre painter (born 1610)
 June 16 – Anne Killigrew, English poet and painter (born 1660)
 August 8 – Giovanni Battista Salvi or Sassoferrato, Italian painter (born 1609)
 September – Adam Colonia, Dutch painter working in England (born 1634)
 October 2 – David Teniers III, Flemish painter (born 1638)
 October 3 – Juan Carreño de Miranda, Spanish painter (born 1614)
 date unknown
 Li Yin, Chinese painter, poet and calligrapher (born c.1610)
 Giulio Trogli, Italian painter nicknamed il Paradosso ("the Paradox") (born 1613)
 Jan Baptist van Heil, Flemish painter (born 1604)

References

 
Years of the 17th century in art
1680s in art